Silvano Vigni (born 7 August 1954 in Monteroni d'Arbia, Italy, known as Bastiano) is a retired Italian Palio jockey, and one of the most notorious competitors in Il Palio Di Siena in the 20th century with a strong rivalry with another rider, Andrea Degortes (known as Aceto).  Silvano won 5 Palios between 1978 and 1990.

Palio Victories
 3 July 1978 - winning for Contrade Della Selva
 7 September 1980 - winning for Contrade Della Selva
 2 July 1981 -  winning for Contrade Dell' Aquila
 3 July 1983 - winning for Contrade Della Leocorno
 2 July 1990 - winning for Contrade Della Giraffa

References
The Palio website - records of Palio wins and jockey information

1954 births
Italian jockeys
Living people